Shah Kola (also Romanized as Shāh Kolā; also known as Shāh Kolā-ye Sūrak) is a village in Dabuy-ye Jonubi Rural District, Dabudasht District, Amol County, Mazandaran Province, Iran. At the 2006 census, its population was 401, in 104 families.

References 

Populated places in Amol County